Kheir Abad Hoomeh may refer to:
 Kheyrabad, Anbarabad
 Kheyrabad, Yazd